Grattons Park is a  Local Nature Reserve in Crawley in West Sussex, England. It is owned by Crawley Borough Council and managed by the council and Gatwick Greenspace Partnership.

Gatwick Stream runs through this park and other habitats are broadleaved woodland and grassland. Flora include lesser celandine and wild daffodils, while there are birds such as Eurasian treecreepers, great spotted woodpecker and long-tailed tits.

There is access from St Mary's Drive.

References

Local Nature Reserves in West Sussex